Mauro Nespoli (born 22 November 1987, in Voghera) is an Italian archer who was a member of the Italian teams that won gold at the 2012 Summer Olympics and silver at the 2008 Summer Olympics. and individual silver at Tokyo 2020 Tokyo Summer Olympics.

Biography
Nespoli was born in Voghera (Province of Pavia), the place where he has always lived. He first saw some archers when he was nine, while he was spending his holidays in Aprica (Sondrio). His coach is Luciano Malovini, who was an archer of the Paralympic Italian National Team. In spite of his hard training and attending archery events, Nespoli could achieve good marks at school. He got his graduation Diploma in 2006 and he is now attending university, in Pavia, studying Computer Engineering.

Sport career
He won his first gold medal in the Italian "Giochi della Gioventù" (Youth Games) in 1998. When he was only fourteen, in 2002, he was picked for the Italian Junior National Team for the first time. Since 2006 he has been a member of the Italian Senior National Team, together with Marco Galiazzo and Michele Frangilli.  In his brief sport career, Nespoli has already participated in 20 international competitions with the Italian National Team and achieved several records too.

At the 2008 Summer Olympics in Beijing Nespoli finished his ranking round with a total of 649 points. This made him the 44th seed for the final competition bracket in which he faced Alan Wills in the first round. Wills won the match 103–99 and went on to reach the third round in which he lost to Juan Carlos Stevens.

Together with Marco Galiazzo and Ilario Di Buò he also took part in the team event. With his 649 score from the ranking round combined with the 667 of Galiazzo and the 670 of Di Buò the Italians were in sixth position after the ranking round. In the first round they were too strong for the Canadian team 219–217. They advanced to the semi final by eliminating Malaysia 218–213. After that they reached the final by beating Ukraine 223–221. In the final they managed to get 225 points, but South Korea took the gold medal with 227 points.

At the 2012 Summer Olympics, he was eleventh after the ranking round, scoring 674, but lost to Chen Yu-Cheng in the first round. In the team event, Italy were ranked in 6th after the ranking round.  Italy proceeded to beat Chinese Taipei 216–206 in the first round, China 220–216 in the quarterfinals, Mexico 217–215 in the semifinals and the United States 219–218 in the final.

His final opponent at the 2020 Tokyo Olympics was Meta Gazoz who beat him 6–4.

He won the bronze medal in the men's team recurve event at the 2022 European Indoor Archery Championships held in Laško, Slovenia. He won the gold medal in the men's team recurve event at the 2022 European Archery Championships held in Munich, Germany. Nespoli and Tatiana Andreoli won the bronze medal in the mixed team recurve event.

Performance timeline in Outdoor Recurve

Individual

Team

Records

Medals

 1 Gold Team medal in the World Cup;
 1 Silver Team medal in the Indoor World Championship;
 1 Bronze Team medal in the Outdoor World Championship;
 1 Bronze Team medal in the Outdoor European Championship;
 1 Gold Individual medal in the Outdoor European Junior Cup;
 3 Bronze Team medals in the Outdoor European Junior Cup;
 1 Bronze Individual medal in the Outdoor European Junior Cup;
 5 Gold Individual medals in the Indoor/Outdoor Italian Championship;
 1 Gold Team medal in the Indoor Italian Championship 2003;
 1 Silver Individual medal in the Outdoor Italian Championship 2007;
 2 Silver Individual medals in the Italian Indoor Championship 2008;
 1 Gold medal in the Nîmes European Archery Tournament (Indoor) 2007.
 1 Gold Team medal in the London Olympic Games 2012;

References

External links
 
 
 Mauro Nespoli at FITArco 
 
 
 

1987 births
Living people
People from Voghera
Italian male archers
Olympic archers of Italy
Archers at the 2008 Summer Olympics
Archers at the 2012 Summer Olympics
Archers at the 2016 Summer Olympics
Olympic silver medalists for Italy
Olympic medalists in archery
Olympic gold medalists for Italy
Medalists at the 2012 Summer Olympics
Medalists at the 2008 Summer Olympics
Archers at the 2015 European Games
European Games medalists in archery
European Games gold medalists for Italy
Mediterranean Games silver medalists for Italy
Mediterranean Games bronze medalists for Italy
Competitors at the 2013 Mediterranean Games
Competitors at the 2022 Mediterranean Games
Mediterranean Games medalists in archery
Archers at the 2019 European Games
Archers of Centro Sportivo Aeronautica Militare
Archers at the 2020 Summer Olympics
Medalists at the 2020 Summer Olympics
Sportspeople from the Province of Pavia
21st-century Italian people